Carex japonica, known as East Asian sedge, is a species of perennial sedge of the genus Carex which can be used like an ornamental plant.

References

External links
  Carex japonica

japonica
Plants described in 1784